Quentin Lafargue (born 17 November 1990) is a French professional track cyclist. He rode at the 2015 UCI Track Cycling World Championships.

References

External links

1990 births
Living people
French male cyclists
French track cyclists
Sportspeople from Hautes-Pyrénées
UCI Track Cycling World Champions (men)
Cyclists at the 2019 European Games
European Games medalists in cycling
European Games silver medalists for France
Cyclists from Occitania (administrative region)
21st-century French people